Tangermünde was a Verwaltungsgemeinschaft ("collective municipality") in the district of Stendal, in Saxony-Anhalt, Germany. The seat of the Verwaltungsgemeinschaft was in Tangermünde. It was disbanded on 1 January 2010.

The Verwaltungsgemeinschaft Tangermünde consisted of the following municipalities:

Bölsdorf 
Buch 
Grobleben 
Hämerten
Langensalzwedel
Miltern 
Storkau 
Tangermünde

References

Former Verwaltungsgemeinschaften in Saxony-Anhalt